Steve Bruno (born November 3, 1981) is an American professional mixed martial artist currently competing in the Welterweight division. A professional competitor since 2001, Bruno has formerly competed for the UFC, the IFL, and the MFC.

Mixed martial arts career

Early career
Bruno started his mixed martial arts career in May 2001, when he faced Opie Barr at Rumble in Chula Vista 1. He won the fight via armbar submission. Following this, Bruno would compile a professional record of 11–3 before signing with the UFC in mid-2008.

Ultimate Fighting Championship
With a record of 11–3, Bruno signed with the Ultimate Fighting Championship. He was expected to face Chad Reiner in his debut at UFC Fight Night 10 on June 12, 2007. However, Bruno was forced out of the bout due to injury and was replaced by Anthony Johnson.

Bruno was then scheduled to face Chris Wilson at UFC 86 on July 5, 2008. However, the fight would be postponed and instead took place at UFC 87 on August 9, 2008. Bruno lost the fight via unanimous decision.

Bruno was expected to face Luke Cummo at UFC: Fight for the Troops on December 10, 2008. However, Cummo was forced out of the bout due to injury and was replaced by Johnny Rees. He won the bout via second round rear-naked choke.

In his third fight in the promotion, Bruno faced Matt Riddle at UFC Fight Night: Lauzon vs. Stephens on February 7, 2009. He lost the fight via unanimous decision, and was subsequently released from the promotion after dropping to 1–2.

Championship and Accomplishments
Spirit MC Middleweight (-80 kg) Championship (One time;)

Post-UFC career
Fighting outside of the UFC, Bruno faced Clayton McKinney at AFL: Rumble on the Rock on September 25, 2009. He won the fight via D'arce choke. He then faced Robert Thompson at MFA: New Generation 3 on September 18, 2010. He won the fight via submission (punches).

Bruno moved to 3–0 since his UFC release, when he won a unanimous decision over Anderson Melo at Fight Time 10 on June 22, 2012. In his latest fight, Bruno faced Keith Johnson at Fight Time 12 on November 2, 2012. He lost the fight via TKO, snapping his three fight winning streak.

Coaching career

Bruno is currently a striking coach at American Top Team.

Personal life
Before starting his mixed martial arts career, Bruno was a Naval Air Crewman and Rescue Swimmer in the United States Navy.

Mixed martial arts record

|-
|Loss
|align=center|15–6
|Keith Johnson
|TKO (punches)
|Fight Time 12: Warriors Collide 
|
|align=center| 2
|align=center| 3:46
|Fort Lauderdale, Florida, United States
|Catchweight (175 lbs) bout.
|-
|Win
|align=center|15–5
|Anderson Melo
|Decision (unanimous)
|Fight Time 10: It's Personal
|
|align=center| 3
|align=center| 5:00
|Fort Lauderdale, Florida, United States
|Catchweight (174 lbs) bout.
|-
|Win
|align=center|14–5
|Robert Thompson
|Submission (punches)
|MFA: New Generation 3
|
|align=center|2
|align=center|3:48
|Miami, Florida, United States
|
|-
|Win
|align=center|13–5
|Clayton McKinney
|Submission (D'arce choke)
|AFL: Rumble on the Rock
|
|align=center|2
|align=center|1:33
|Hollywood, Florida, United States
|
|-
|Loss
|align=center|12–5
|Matt Riddle
|Decision (unanimous)
|UFC Fight Night: Lauzon vs. Stephens
|
|align=center|3
|align=center|5:00
|Tampa, Florida, United States
|
|-
|Win
|align=center|12–4
|Johnny Rees
|Submission (rear-naked choke)
|UFC: Fight For The Troops
|
|align=center|2
|align=center|3:44
|Fayetteville, North Carolina, United States
|
|-
|Loss
|align=center|11–4
|Chris Wilson
|Decision (unanimous)
|UFC 87
|
|align=center|3
|align=center|5:00
|Minneapolis, Minnesota, United States
|
|-
|Win
|align=center|11–3
|Lim Jae-Suk
|KO (punches)
|Spirit MC 11: Invasion
|
|align=center|3
|align=center|2:52
|Seoul, South Korea
|Won Spirit MC Middleweight (176 lbs) Championship.
|-
|Win
|align=center|10–3
|Ho Jin Kim
|KO (punch)
|Spirit MC: Interleague 5
|
|align=center|2
|align=center|4:24
|Seoul, South Korea
|
|-
|Win
|align=center|9–3
|Graydon Tannas
|Submission (rear-naked choke)
|MFC 11: Gridiron
|
|align=center|1
|align=center|1:15
|Edmonton, Alberta, Canada
|
|-
|Win
|align=center|8–3
|Young Choi
|KO (punches)
|Spirit MC 9: Welterweight GP Opening
|
|align=center|3
|align=center|3:19
|Seoul, South Korea
|
|-
|Loss
|align=center|7–3
|Bart Palaszewski
|KO (punch)
|IFL: Championship 2006
|
|align=center|1
|align=center|1:48
|Atlantic City, New Jersey, United States
|
|-
|Loss
|align=center|7–2
|Landon Showalter
|Decision (unanimous)
|MFC: Boardwalk Blitz
|
|align=center|2
|align=center|5:00
|Atlantic City, New Jersey, United States
|
|-
|Win
|align=center|7–1
|Jay Jack
|TKO (punches)
|Euphoria: USA vs. Japan
|
|align=center|1
|align=center|4:02
|Atlantic City, New Jersey, United States
|
|-
|Win
|align=center|6–1
|Anthony Tolone
|TKO (punches)
|AFC 13: Absolute Fighting Championships 13
|
|align=center|1
|align=center|3:51
|Fort Lauderdale, Florida, United States
|
|-
|Win
|align=center|5–1
|Chris Schlesinger
|Decision (majority)
|RF 8: Reality Fighting 8
|
|align=center|2
|align=center|5:00
|Atlantic City, New Jersey, United States
|
|-
|Win
|align=center|4–1
|Gino Astudillo
|TKO (punches)
|AFC 9: Absolute Fighting Championships 9
|
|align=center|1
|align=center|0:40
|Fort Lauderdale, Florida, United States
|
|-
|Win
|align=center|3–1
|Jorge Cuellar
|Submission (rear-naked choke)
|RM 3: Reto Maximo 3
|
|align=center|1
|align=center|1:51
| Tijuana, Mexico
|
|-
|Loss
|align=center|2–1
|Heath Sims
|Decision (unanimous)
|XP 2: Xtreme Pankration 2
|
|align=center|2
|align=center|5:00
|Los Angeles, California, United States
|
|-
|Win
|align=center|2–0
|Jeff Gibson
|Submission (armbar)
|RICV 2: Rumble in Chula Vista 2
|
|align=center|N/A
|align=center|N/A
|San Diego, California, United States
|
|-
|Win
|align=center|1–0
|Opie Barr
|Submission (armbar)
|RICV 1: Rumble in Chula Vista 1
|
|align=center|N/A
|align=center|N/A
|San Diego, California, United States
|

References

External links
 
 

1982 births
Living people
American male mixed martial artists
Mixed martial artists from Florida
Welterweight mixed martial artists
Sportspeople from Coral Springs, Florida
Ultimate Fighting Championship male fighters